Money and the Woman is a 1940 American drama film directed by William K. Howard and written by Robert Presnell Sr.. The film stars Jeffrey Lynn, Brenda Marshall, John Litel, Lee Patrick, Henry O'Neill and Roger Pryor. The film was released by Warner Bros. on August 17, 1940.

Plot

Cast 
Jeffrey Lynn as Dave Bennett
Brenda Marshall as Barbara Patteson
John Litel as Jeremy 'Jerry ' Helm
Lee Patrick as Miss Martha Church
Henry O'Neill as Mr. Mason
Roger Pryor as Charles 'Charlie' Patteson
Guinn 'Big Boy' Williams as Mr. Adler
Henry Kolker as Mr. Rollins
William Gould as Chief Detective Dyer
Edward Keane as Mr. Kaiser
William Marshall as Bank Clerk
Peter Ashley as Bank Teller
Mildred Coles as Secretary at Bank
Sandra Stephenson as Jeannie Patteson
Willie Best as George Washington Jones

References

External links 
 

1940 films
American drama films
1940 drama films
Films based on works by James M. Cain
Films directed by William K. Howard
Warner Bros. films
American black-and-white films
1940s English-language films
1940s American films
Films scored by Bernhard Kaun